The 1993 Sydney to Hobart Yacht Race was the 49th annual running of the Australian "blue water classic" Sydney to Hobart Yacht Race. It was hosted by the Cruising Yacht Club of Australia based in Sydney.

The 1993 race, as in every year, began on Port Jackson (Sydney Harbour), at noon on Boxing Day (26 December 1993) before heading south for 630 nautical miles (1,170 km) through the Tasman Sea, past Bass Strait into Storm Bay and up the Derwent River to cross the finish line in Hobart, Tasmania.

"While racing the distance of 630 nautical miles (the equivalent of over 1100 kilometres) under sail is in itself daunting, the unpredictable and often treacherous seas encountered, particularly in crossing Bass Strait make the Sydney-Hobart one of ocean racing's classic challenges. ----- it is the toughest middle distance ocean race in the world. ----- In yachting circles, a sailor who has 'done the Hobart race' commands considerable respect"
 Those that survived and completed the 93 Hobart deserve mention.

Race calamity
The 1993 fleet comprised 104 starters. Of those 104 starters, only 38 of them completed the race due to severe weather conditions which struck the fleet near the south-eastern Australian coast as they entered Bass Strait at night. This race was arguably the toughest in recent history as the lowest number of completing yachts attests as does a staggering attrition rate. Fortunately there were no fatalities (in contrast to the 1998 yacht race, in which six died).

An unusually strong low pressure depression of 986 hpa developed, that a CSIRO Oceanography satellite photograph (unusual at the time) revealed as a spiral cloud stretching down the Queensland coast across the Tasman Sea to the south island of New Zealand back across to Tasmania and corkscrewing in to the storm center in Bass Strait, where the fleet were centred. The weather built into an exceptionally strong storm (which had similar strength winds to a lower-category hurricane reaching up to 70 knots and estimated 12-meter seas, resulting in two yachts abandoned and a man overboard incident. Additionally a record 66 yachts retired from the race or sank. The winning yacht Ninety Seven recorded  of wind either side of the eye of the low off Gabo Island on the night of 27 December.

The April/May 1994 edition of Offshore (the official journal of CYCA) contained articles in a retrospective analysis of the 1993 Hobart race. David Lyons, the designer and crew aboard Cuckoos Nest, the IMS handicap winner, made the following personal comment, when asked why so many yachts had failed to complete, he said; 1. Yacht structural designs being inadequate for the conditions. 2. A misunderstanding of ABS approval processes. 3. Refined rig designs that fail to meet the race loads. 4. Poor maintenance. 5. Yachts pushed beyond design limits. 6. Crews retiring due to own limitations when tired and seasick, which goes to adequacy of experience.

In an article on helmsmanship during the race, John Gray, an AYF Offshore Yachtmaster aboard Sea-U-Later, a 12m admirals cup yacht, described how they discovered only 3 out of 8 crew were capable of helming in those conditions at night, without endangering the boat or crew, and then for only one hour at a time. Early recognition of this and altering watches to cater was central to their survival and completion of the race. Only one of the three had previous Hobart experience, but all three were seasoned offshore racers.

They were also critical of the races on water weather forecasting, which during the three days of storm, did not alter its forecast for a following SE wind change, which never eventuated. But probably lured yachts further south and away from Tasmania than necessary before tacking due west to close the coast. Sea-U-Later along with other yachts tracked down the 151-degree east longitude, becoming becalmed for 20 hours around 42 degrees south, in the centre of the weakened low, that all weather reports had said had moved well into the Tasman Sea. Whilst a respite the delay cost them dearly, Sea-U-Later was 37th to complete the race. The official explanation of the meteorology during the period was in the same edition, but somehow this was not communicated to yachts at sea at the time.

As a response to the record retirement rate the Cruising Yacht Club of Australia issued an extensive questionnaire to yacht owners seeking comment on suitability of storm sails, adequacy of radio communications and suitability of CYCA's standard safety equipment. They were also asked to comment "As a result of your experience in this race is there anything you would do before starting, in say, the 1994 race to lessen the possibility of retiring should the same weather and sea conditions be anticipated'’.

In the 1993 Offshore race issue the CYCA had been "predicting a massive fleet of 200 yachts from around the world to mark this nautical milestone in yachting history" (the 50th anniversary race). The commodores message expanded, " I hope that all owners and skippers will back up again at the end of 1994 to make the 50th. Anniversary bash to Hobart one of the largest long ocean race fleets in the history of yachting, we believe a fleet in excess of 200 yachts is highly likely."

As the official Sydney to Hobart Yacht Race records now show, there were 371 starters and 309 finishers in 1994. It was not until 1998 that similar weather conditions returned with devastating results. Some of the lessons of 1993 had apparently not been learnt. has been the occasion for many sailboat capsizes, turtlings and fatalities.

Race progress
South westers that had been blowing in Bass strait for several days cancelling the start of the Melbourne to Tasmania yacht races, had lumped up big seas that awaited the Hobart yachts. Through 27 December, the day after the start 29 boats retired, two of them abandoned sinking and a man lost overboard after the webbing of his harness snapped. Many yachts broke off racing to answer flares and three Mayday distress calls, some of the drama of the race included;

John Quinn 49 owner/skipper of the J/35 yacht MEM went overboard without lifejacket, about 11–30 pm when a wave flattened the yacht, and was miraculously rescued by an oil tanker the Ampol Sorrel who heard his crews radio call. In the dark of night in horrific conditions, they steamed to the search area then turned on a Searchlight and found him almost immediately. After being in the water 5 and ½ hrs He was picked up by the yacht Atari who had joined the search after losing her mast, and was nearby.

The crew of Adjuster abandoned her in sinking condition for the life raft which overturned and they spent the last hour clinging to it before rescue by Kingurra. The yacht Clwyd was swamped and eventually overturned when the keel fell off, the crew were rescued by Nynja Go then transferred to the radio relay vessel. The NZ yacht Swuzzlebubble VIII was rolled 360 degrees by a breaking wave, turtled, dismasted and swamped. On deck crew harnessed on were all recovered. The crew then cut the rig off, put out a No 3 headsil as a sea anchor and bailed her out while other yachts stood nearby. They managed to start the engine and motored into Eden. Meanwhile, Prime Factor of Adelaide came off a big wave at speed when the mast and the main bulkhead to which it was fastened pulled straight out of the deck of the boat and disappeared over the side. Two crew members of Advantaged were injured when the yacht capsized, snapping the mast off at the base, four crew were flung overboard but quickly recovered. The navigator was thrown through a bulkhead, head first. On Atara the mast slammed through the port side and it began taking water, but reached Eden where many sought shelter and carried out repairs. Brindabella a new Jutson 75 was retired with delamination at the bow, possibly after hitting a whale. By the end of 28 December 56 yachts had retired, a further 11 by the 30th see list below. At least one of the smallest yachts sheltered in NSW ports during the worst conditions and managed to complete the race within time.

This left Ninety Seven out in front with Cuckoos Nest a 40 footer crossing tacks during the race several times, Ninety seven eventually crossed 2 hours and 1 minute ahead of her rival. The IOR winner was Wild Oats.

Fleet
Only 38 of the 104 yachts which started in the 1993 Sydney to Hobart Yacht Race finished. These yachts are listed below:

Retirements
The following is known of the 66 other yachts (listed in order of retirement date) that started but did not finish:

Results

See also
1979 Fastnet race
1998 Sydney to Hobart Yacht Race
Fastnet race
Turtling

References

Sydney to Hobart Yacht Race
Sydney To Hobart Yacht Race, 1993
1993 in Australian sport
December 1993 sports events in Australia
January 1994 sports events in Australia